The chukudu (or chikudu, cbokoudou, tshukudu) is a two-wheeled handmade vehicle used in the east of the Democratic Republic of Congo. It is made of wood, and is used for transporting cargo.

The chukudu generally has an angular frame, two small wheels (often of wood, sometimes wrapped with rubber), handlebars, and a pad for the operator to place their knee on while propelling the vehicle with their leg. On a descent, the rider stands on the deck like a kick scooter. On flat ground, the rider can put one knee on the deck and push the ground by the other foot like a knee scooter.

Rubber mud flaps and shock absorber springs may be added.

History 
Chukudus first appeared in the 1970s in North Kivu, during the difficult economic times under Mobutu Sese Seko.

In 2008, chikudus were selling for US$100 with a cost of materials of nearly US$60. Similarly, in 2014 they cost $50 to $100 and were used to earn up to $10 per day, in an area where most people live on less than $2 per day. A 2014 article estimated a cost of about US$150, which a driver could pay off in about six months, earning $10–20 per day.

Construction 
In Goma, where chukudus form the "backbone of the local transportation system", chukudus are made of hard mumba wood and eucalyptus wood, with scrap tires for wheel treads. These chukudus take one to three days to build, and last two to three years. The most commonly used size is about six and a half feet long, and carries a load of 1000 lbs. However, "the largest chukudus can carry up to 800 kilograms of weight."

A small chukudu can be built in about three hours, using dimensional lumber and materials available in a hardware store.

The chukudu is customizable to carry different types of cargo. To haul firewood some chukudus have a hole drilled in the middle of the sitting deck, and the operator can insert a stick to hold firewood in place. Others have a large basket to carry various loads.

See also 
Cart
Cargo bike
Hand truck
Wooden bicycle

References

External links 

Chukudus in Goma - YouTube
 

Bicycles
Human-powered vehicles
Rwandan culture
Transport in Rwanda
Democratic Republic of the Congo culture
Transport in the Democratic Republic of the Congo